The Siddeley Tiger was an unsuccessful British aero engine developed shortly after the end of World War I by Siddeley-Deasy. Problems encountered during flight testing caused the project to be cancelled.

Design and development
Developed using two modified cylinder banks from the Siddeley Puma, the Tiger was a liquid-cooled 60-degree V12 engine with the advanced feature of an electric starter motor protected by a friction clutch. A reduction gear arrangement was provided for the propeller drive with a ratio of 0.559:1. The company claimed a power output of 600 hp (447 kW) but this was regarded as optimistic. Flight testing by a Royal Aircraft Establishment test pilot, Frank Courtenay, revealed problems and his opinion of the engine was low as the following quote shows:

Application and cancellation
The Tarrant Tabor, a giant triplane bomber was designed to use the Tiger but redesigned to use other engines when it became clear the Tiger would not be available soon enough.
The only aircraft in which the Siddeley Tiger flew was the ill-fated prototype of the twin-engined Siddeley-Deasy Siniai of which three were planned to be produced. Major problems with both the engines and this experimental bomber aircraft led to cancellation of the projects.

The Siddeley Tiger marked the end of the aero engine line started by Beardmore and Siddeley-Deasy. The name was later re-used for an Armstrong Siddeley radial engine.

Specifications (Tiger)

See also

References

Notes

Bibliography

 Gunston, Bill. World Encyclopedia of Aero Engines. Cambridge, England. Patrick Stephens Limited, 1989. 
 Lumsden, Alec. British Piston Engines and their Aircraft. Marlborough, Wiltshire: Airlife Publishing, 2003. .

External links
 Contemporary technical description of the engine with photographs.

Tiger
1920s aircraft piston engines